Dmitriy Stepanovich Shevchenko (also spelled Chevtchenko, born 13 November 1967 in Moscow) is a Russian fencer, who won a gold Olympic medal in the team foil competition at the 1996 Summer Olympics in Atlanta and bronze Olympic medal in the individual foil competition at the 2000 Summer Olympics in Sydney.

References

External links 
 
 
 
 

1967 births
Living people
Martial artists from Moscow
Soviet male fencers
Russian male fencers
Fencers at the 1992 Summer Olympics
Fencers at the 1996 Summer Olympics
Fencers at the 2000 Summer Olympics
Olympic fencers of the Unified Team
Olympic fencers of Russia
Olympic gold medalists for Russia
Olympic bronze medalists for Russia
Olympic medalists in fencing
Medalists at the 1996 Summer Olympics
Medalists at the 2000 Summer Olympics
Universiade medalists in fencing
Universiade gold medalists for the Soviet Union